Empire Collins was a  tanker which was built in 1942 by Sir J Laing & Sons Ltd, Sunderland for the  Ministry of War Transport (MoWT). In 1945 she was sold into merchant service and renamed Southern Collins. She was sold in 1956 to Panama and renamed Cassian Sailor. In 1960 she was sold to Pakistan and renamed Mushtari. She was scrapped in 1964.

Description
The ship was built by Sir J Laing & Sons Ltd, Sunderland as yard number 745. She was launched on 29 June 1942 and completed in December 1942.

She had a GRT of 9,795 and a NRT of 5,784. Her DWT was 14,766.

The engine was built by North East Marine Engine Co (1938) Ltd, Newcastle upon Tyne. The engine could propel her at  empty,  loaded.

History
Empire Collins was built for the MoWT. She was placed under the management of Haldin & Phillips Ltd. Her port of registry was Sunderland. The Code Letters BFFM and United Kingdom Official Number 169106 were allocated.

Empire Collins was a member of a number of convoys in the Second World War.

ON 161
Convoy ON 161 departed Liverpool on 12 January 1943 and arrived at New York on 31 January. Empire Collins became detached from the convoy on 30 January in poor visibility.

MKS 16
Convoy MKS 16 departed Alexandria, Egypt on 24 June 1943, and arrived at Tripoli, Libya on 29 June. Leaving Tripoli that day, it arrived at Gibraltar on 6 July. The convoy departed Gibraltar on 9 July 1943 and arrived at Liverpool on 22 July. Empire Collins departed from Algiers.

In 1945, Empire Collins was sold to The South Georgia Co Ltd. She was placed under the management of Christian Salvesen & Co Ltd and was renamed Southern Collins. Her port of registry was changed to Leith. In 1952, Southern Collins ran aground at the entrance to Leith Harbour and was holed, losing much of her cargo of whale oil.

In May 1956, Southern Collins was sold to San Felicia Compagnia Navigacion, Panama and was renamed Cassian Sailor. In April 1960, she was sold to the Gulf Steamship Co Ltd, Karachi, West Pakistan and was renamed Mushtari. She was scrapped in 1964 at Karachi.

References

External links
 Photo of Southern Collins

1942 ships
Ships built on the River Wear
Tankers of the United Kingdom
Steamships of the United Kingdom
Ministry of War Transport ships
Empire ships
World War II tankers
Merchant ships of the United Kingdom
Maritime incidents in 1952
Steamships of Panama
Merchant ships of Panama
Steamships of Pakistan
Merchant ships of Pakistan